"Until the Last Day" is the forty-first single of  Japanese solo artist Gackt, released on February 22, 2012. It is the theme song for the CG-animated movie Dragon Age: Dawn of the Seeker. The song was covered in mixed English version by Gackt's band Yellow Fried Chickenz and was included as a bonus track in their studio album Yellow Fried Chickenz I, released in March 2012.

Track listings and formats

Chart performance

Oricon sales chart 

Billboard Japan

References

2012 singles
Gackt songs
Film theme songs
Animated series theme songs
Songs with lyrics by Shoko Fujibayashi
Songs written by Gackt
2012 songs